Fungiacyathus is a genus of corals belonging to the monotypic family Fungiacyathidae.

Subgenus:
 Fungiacyathus (Bathyactis) Durègne, 1886
 Fungiacyathus crispus (Pourtalès, 1871)
 Fungiacyathus dennanti Cairns & Parker, 1992
 Fungiacyathus fissidiscus Cairns & Zibrowius, 1997
 ...

References

Scleractinia
Scleractinia genera